Craft is a bimonthly Japanese yaoi manga magazine published by Taiyoh Tosho. A number of works published in this magazine have been licensed in English, mostly by Digital Manga Publishing.

Originally published on a quarterly basis, on October 19, 2019, Taiyoh Tosho announced that beginning with the December 2019 issue, the magazine would be distributed digitally on a bimonthly basis.

Licensed titles published in Craft
Butterfly of the Distant Day, Tooko Miyagi
The Day I Become a Butterfly, Sumomo Yumeka
I Give to You, Maki Ebishi
Il gatto sul G, Tooko Miyagi
Kiss Blue, Keiko Kinoshita
New Beginnings, Kotetsuko Yamamoto
No Touching At All, Kou Yoneda
The Paradise on the Hill, Momoko Tenzen
Same Cell Organism, Sumomo Yumeka
Seven Days, Rihito Takarai and Venio Tachibana
You and Harujion, Keiko Kinoshita

References

Semimonthly manga magazines published in Japan
Magazines with year of establishment missing
Yaoi manga magazines